Daniel "Danny" Tenaglia (born March 7, 1961) is an American DJ and record producer. He is a Grammy nominee for the best remixed recording (44th Annual Grammy Award). He is also a three time International Dance Music Award winner, 3 time DJ Awards winner and 2 time Muzik Awards recipient.

Biography

Early life
At the age of ten, Tenaglia started to collect records. In 1979, he began going to nightclub Paradise Garage, where DJ Larry Levan's genre-less blend of music appealed to him. This was the club model Tenaglia would one day emulate: Levan's bold style, the venue's plain décor, and the party's warmth and inclusiveness.

Tenaglia left New York in 1985 and started DJing in Miami as a resident at Cheers nightclub, playing classic New York and Chicago house. He returned to New York five years later. At this time, he started to create some remixes, including Right Said Fred's "I'm Too Sexy" (1991), Jamiroquai's "Emergency on Planet Earth" (1993), and Madonna's "Human Nature" (1994).

DJ career
Tenaglia's first mainstream success was with a remix of The Daou's "Surrender Yourself" (1993). The title of his 1995 debut artist album on New York's TRIBAL America/IRS Records described the genre as Hard & Soul. Tenaglia cited his influences ranged from Patti LaBelle to Kraftwerk, with many lesser-known soul, R&B, Latin, samba and disco artists in between.

Subsequent to this Tenaglia released three label compilations - Mix This Pussy (1994) and Can Your Pussy Do The Dog? (1995) for TRIBAL, and Gag Me with a Tune (1996) for Maxi.

As a producer
In 1996, after working for a short time at the New York nightclub Roxy, Tenaglia started a Saturday night residency at Twilo, a position that brought him some public attention. Contrary to the music popular in New York at the time, Tenaglia was producing the more minimal, techy grooves originating in European production studios. This period produced remixes like Grace's "Not Over Yet" (1996) and Janet Jackson's "The Pleasure Principle" (1996).  In 1998, he moved his residency over to NY club Tunnel.

In 1998, Danny released another album titled Tourism.  The album featured the notable track "Elements". With his own warped voice providing the narration, "Elements" walked the listener through the different components of a dance track in real time, going from the kick to drum loop to snare hit, letting each layer over the other until the track exploded with dark, drum-heavy energy.  "Elements" was #1 on the Billboard Dance Chart for two weeks in 1998. "Music Is The Answer" featuring Celeda (also on the LP Tourism) was on the top 40 charts in the UK. Next to ostentatious radio anthems, its simplicity was a revelation.

The release of his first installment in the UK-based Global Underground series of DJ mixes, titled Athens (1999), was well received. Back in New York, Tenaglia grew tired of Tunnel and sought a venue more similar to the Paradise Garage. He landed at Vinyl, a black-walled, single-environment, no-liquor club about one-quarter the size of Tunnel. He named the night "Be Yourself," after the self-affirming, heavy-bottomed vocal track he had recently recorded with Chicago's Celeda.

In 2000, Tenaglia's annual party during Miami's Winter Music Conference outgrew its home at the cramped Groovejet and moved to the just-opened superclub Space. DJ giants like Carl Cox danced on top of the speakers with the Deep Dish boys, Fatboy Slim mingled on the patio, and for a day the ego inherent to DJ culture evaporated: Tenaglia was hailed as the "DJ's DJ." His revamp of Green Velvet's "Flash" won "Best Remix" at the UK's Muzik Awards, where he was also awarded the "Best International DJ" prize.

In the two years that followed, Tenaglia released another Global Underground installment titled London, remixed Billy Nichols' "Give Your Body Up To The Music" (a Garage anthem); got nominated for a Grammy (for his remix of Depeche Mode's "I Feel Loved," also nominated for Best Dance Song) and won a Dancestar Lifetime Achievement award.

In 2003, Danny came full circle with the release of Choice: A Collection Of Classics, a two-CD mixed compilation that let him pay direct tribute to many of the artists who had influenced his sound and style. It featured artists such as Blaze, Adeva and Imagination, along with his own liner notes explaining the significance of each track. He also remixed another Garage classic (Yoko Ono's "Walking On Thin Ice," which became her first Billboard number one ever), opened another Space during Winter Music Conference (the new location down the block), and took another Dancestar award, this time 'Best Party' for "Be Yourself."

"Be Yourself" took the same honor again in 2004, but by this time, Vinyl, now called Arc, had already been sold to condo developers. Danny closed the club on Sunday, April 25, 2004.

Current events 

Since then Tenaglia has remained prolific in the clubs and has played in NYC locations including Avalon, Crobar, Pacha NYC, Roxy and Webster Hall. In 2007, Tenaglia participated in the Dance parade. After a long studio silence, Danny re-emerged in 2008 with a single on Tommy Boy Records, "The Space Dance". It was named in honor of his first weekly residency during the summer season of 2008 at renowned global clubbing institution Space Ibiza.  The track reached number 1 on the Billboard Club Charts during November 2008.

Immediately following that, Tenaglia released his first compilation album in five years, entitled Futurism, also on Tommy Boy Records.  The compilation featured tracks from artists whom Tenaglia had been championing for several years including Davide Squillace, The Wighnomy Brothers and Afefe Iku.  On January 24, 2016, Tenaglia was the closing DJ of another club, Pacha NYC. At the end of his 7-hour set, while taking requests, he made reference to his multiple club-closings, by rejecting some songs by stating that they were already played at the closing of Vinyl / Arc and others.

Tenaglia still continues to tour across the world. His commitment to playing new music and incorporating it with music from his past is still a very big part of his performances.

Awards and nominations

Grammy Awards
Included:

DJ Awards
The DJ Awards organizes the annual electronic music DJ awards event it is the only international ceremony for DJs and also the oldest, the awards are held once a year at Pacha club in Ibiza Spain it is one of the most important accolades an artist can win or be honoured by.

Tenaglia has won the Best Set of the Season Award 2 times and the DJ's DJ Award 1 time and received 5 nominations overall.

International Dance Music Awards
Tengalia has achieved three wins from 15 nominations overall.

Muzik Awards

See also
List of artists who reached number one on the US Dance chart

References

External links
dannytenaglia.com Danny Tenaglia Official website

1961 births
Living people
Club DJs
American dance musicians
American house musicians
Electronic dance music DJs
Remixers
DJs from New York City
Nightlife in New York City